The Ottoman Republic is a 2008 Turkish comedy film directed by Gani Müjde. The film, which stars Ata Demirer, is a political comedy built upon the question, "What would have happened if Mustafa Kemal Atatürk never existed?"

Synopsis
The year is 1888. A 7-year-old child was first seen running on a vast field to scare the crows off of the meadows of Thessalonica, and then he falls from a tree while reaching out to a nightingale. Everything goes black. The child who falls from the tree is Mustafa, who would have grown to become the founder of  the Republic of Turkey and be given the surname Atatürk, that is, if he did not fall to his coma that day. The film fast-forwards to over a century later into the year 2007. Without Mustafa Kemal Atatürk in Turkey's history, no War of Independence has been fought, Ankara has not become the country's capital, and the country continues its existence as the Ottoman Republic, ruled by the Sultan Osman VII (Ata Demirer), who has become little more than a figurehead and a source of ridicule by foreign dignitaries, especially by the United States.

At first, he emerges from his palace as Janissaries play a march for him. Outside the palace, several protesters who objected to foreign interference in Ottoman affairs were suppressed by the police. He then prays at a mosque, before the next scenes focus on his wife's shopping.

For all of his bumbling antics, the Sultan was forced to abdicate for his failed administration, and was exiled. The scene shifts from the Istanbul harbour back to the wheat fields of Thessalonica, as the boy Mustafa recovers from his coma. He gets up and runs off beating a can with a stick, as a voice-over of one of his future speeches plays in the background.

Release

Reception

Box Office
The movie was number one at the Turkish box office for two weeks running and was the fourth-highest-grossing Turkish film of 2009 with a total gross of $7,746,467. It remained in the Turkish box-office charts for nineteen weeks and made a total worldwide gross of $8,689,739.

Reviews
In his latest historical comedy, popular satirist and TV writer, Gani Müjde, travels on similar turf, to his debut feature "Kahpe Bizans" (The Perfidious Byzantium), which poked fun at the earlier nationalist films of Turkish cinema, introduces Hürriyet Daily News reviewer Emrah Güler, who concludes, both Gani Müjde and Ata Demirer are favorite household names who never fail to put a smile on followers of Turkish pop culture.

References

External links
 

2008 comedy films
2008 films
Turkish alternate history films
2000s Turkish-language films
Films set in 2007
Films set in Turkey
Films set in Istanbul
Films set in the Ottoman Empire